Borek Wielki is a village in the administrative district of Gmina Sędziszów Małopolski, within Ropczyce-Sędziszów County, Subcarpathian Voivodeship, in south-eastern Poland.

The village has a population of 2,000.

References

Borek Wielki